Renato Josipović (born 12 June 2001) is a Croatian professional footballer who plays as a goalkeeper for Široki Brijeg.

Club career
Josipović started playing football in his hometown at NK Šibenik. Initially a striker, he moved to the position of goalkeeper on coach's recommendation, where he soon showed his talent. At the age of 13 he was already training with the first team. However, in the summer of 2015, after becoming an under-15 national team player, he moved to GNK Dinamo Zagreb, at the age of 14.

At Dinamo, Josipović would make his reserve team debut in 2018, becoming a regular in the 2020–21 season in the Croatian second tier. He was capped for the first team twice, in the last matches of the 2019–20 and 2020–21 seasons, coming in for the last 14 minutes against Varaždin and Šibenik, respectively. After spending the 2021–22 season on loan at NK Bravo in Slovenian PrvaLiga, Josipović's contract with Dinamo was terminated and he signed a one-year contract with Široki Brijeg in Bosnia and Herzegovina.

Career statistics

Club

References

2001 births
Living people
Sportspeople from Šibenik
Association football goalkeepers
Croatian footballers
Croatia youth international footballers
GNK Dinamo Zagreb II players
GNK Dinamo Zagreb players
NK Bravo players
NK Široki Brijeg players
First Football League (Croatia) players
Croatian Football League players
Slovenian PrvaLiga players
Premier League of Bosnia and Herzegovina players
Croatian expatriate footballers
Croatian expatriate sportspeople in Slovenia
Expatriate footballers in Slovenia
Croatian expatriate sportspeople in Bosnia and Herzegovina
Expatriate footballers in Bosnia and Herzegovina